Garganelli are a type of egg-based pasta formed by rolling a flat, square noodle into a cylindrical shape.  Garganelli resembles ribbed quills with points at both ends.

While garganelli are very similar to penne, they differ in that a "flap" is clearly visible where one corner of the pasta square adheres to the rest, as opposed to a seamless cylinder in penne.

Garganelli can be served in a variety of recipes; a traditional duck ragù is a common accompaniment and a specialty of the cuisine of Bologna, Italy.

See also
 List of pasta
 Reed (weaving)

References

Types of pasta
Cuisine of Emilia-Romagna